Celebrity Camp was a Slovak reality show created by TV JOJ based on Survivor. Twenty-six celebrities were sent to the Philippines where they competed in two tribes in a series of challenges with the losing tribe going to Tribal Council to vote out one of its members.

A part of Survivor, Celebrity Camp was more about challenges than survival (contestants have luxury items and food on the beach), but it maintained some similarities with Survivor like tribe division, Tribal Council, and merge into one tribe. Each day contestants competed in a series of challenges and each night the losing tribe must vote out one of its members on Tribal Council. All episodes were shot in Philippines only last two episodes, starting with semi-final were shot in a studio in Slovakia. In the final not jury but public vote determined winner who won prize of 5,000,000 SKK (US$200,000).

Contestants

The game

Voting history

Tribal phase (Day 1–15)

Individual phase (Day 16–23)

References

Slovakia
Slovak reality television series
Television shows filmed in the Philippines